Macon County is a county located in the west central portion of the U.S. state of Georgia. As of the 2020 census, the population was 12,082. The county seat is Oglethorpe.

The Macon County Courthouse is located in Oglethorpe.

History
Macon County was created in 1837 from parts of Houston ("house-ton") and Marion counties, effective December 14 of that year. The 91st county, it was named for the then-recently deceased General Nathaniel Macon of North Carolina, who served in the U.S. Congress for 37 years and ran for U.S. vice president. The city of Macon, Georgia was also named for him, but the city of Macon, Georgia, is the seat of Bibb County, a different county. The county was later reduced when parts were separated to organize Taylor and Peach counties, in 1852 and 1924, respectively.

The first county seat was not chosen until 1838, when the county's inferior court selected Lanier. The Georgia General Assembly (state legislature) designated it on December 29 of that year and incorporated it as a town.

In the 1850s, the Central of Georgia Railroad was built through Oglethorpe, changing county dynamics. As a result, the Georgia Assembly called for a referendum on moving the Macon County seat to Oglethorpe in February of both 1854 and 1856. Little is known about the first vote, but the second vote resulted in approval for a change to the county seat, and Oglethorpe was designated the following year in 1857.

During the Civil War, 13,000 Union soldiers who were prisoners of war died at the Confederate camp in Andersonville, Georgia from starvation and disease. In the late period of the war, Georgia also had difficulty supplying its own troops and people with food. Throughout the Civil War, more men on both sides died of disease than of their wounds. Commandants of the camp were prosecuted after the war for poor treatment of prisoners. The Andersonville National Cemetery, established for the many Union dead, is at the southwestern tip of the county.

The county has an active Mennonite community. The area code for Macon County is currently 478.

Geography
The county is located in the upper Atlantic coastal plain region of the state.

Most of the southern half of Macon County, from west of Ideal to State Route 49 north of Montezuma, then running north along State Route 49 to Marshallville, and then running southeast in the direction of Unadilla, is located in the Middle Flint River sub-basin of the ACF River Basin (Apalachicola-Chattahoochee-Flint River Basin). The northern and northwestern portion of the county, from north of Marshallville heading west, is located in the Upper Flint River sub-basin of the same ACF River Basin. The northeastern corner of Macon County, east of Marshallville, is located in the Lower Ocmulgee River sub-basin of the Altamaha River basin.

Major highways

  State Route 26
  State Route 49
  State Route 90
  State Route 127
  State Route 128
  State Route 128 Bypass
  State Route 224
  State Route 240
  State Route 329

Adjacent counties
 Peach County (northeast)
 Houston County (east)
 Dooly County (southeast)
 Sumter County (south)
 Schley County (southwest)
 Taylor County (northwest)

National protected area
 Andersonville National Historic Site (part)

Demographics

2020 census

As of the 2020 United States census, there were 12,082 people, 4,696 households, and 3,033 families residing in the county.

2010 census
As of the 2010 United States Census, there were 14,740 people, 4,999 households, and 3,363 families living in the county. The racial makeup of the county was 60.6% black or African American, 35.1% white, 1.3% Asian, 0.3% American Indian, 0.1% Pacific islander, 1.6% from other races, and 1.0% from two or more races. Those of Hispanic or Latino origin made up 3.6% of the population. In terms of ancestry, and 7.1% were American.

Of the 4,999 households, 33.0% had children under the age of 18 living with them, 37.5% were married couples living together, 24.0% had a female householder with no husband present, 32.7% were non-families, and 29.2% of all households were made up of individuals. The average household size was 2.56 and the average family size was 3.15. The median age was 38.2 years.

The median income for a household in the county was $27,950 and the median income for a family was $37,218. Males had a median income of $27,274 versus $23,750 for females. The per capita income for the county was $12,902. About 24.1% of families and 33.0% of the population were below the poverty line, including 44.8% of those under age 18 and 27.2% of those age 65 or over.

2000 census
As of the 2000 census of 2000, there were 14,074 people, 4,834 households, and 3,485 families living in the county.  The population density was 35 people per square mile (13/km2).  There were 5,495 housing units at an average density of 14 per square mile (5/km2).  The racial makeup of the county was 59.48% Black or African American, 37.37% White or Caucasian, 0.22% Native American, 0.60% Asian, 0.05% Pacific Islander, 1.52% from other races, and 0.75% from two or more races.  2.59% of the population were Hispanic or Latino of any race.

There were 4,834 households, out of which 34.50% had children under the age of 18 living with them, 42.70% were married couples living together, 24.40% had a female householder with no husband present, and 27.90% were non-families. 25.20% of all households were made up of individuals, and 10.40% had someone living alone who was 65 years of age or older.  The average household size was 2.71 and the average family size was 3.25.

In the county, the population was spread out, with 27.60% under the age of 18, 9.70% from 18 to 24, 27.60% from 25 to 44, 22.30% from 45 to 64, and 12.70% who were 65 years of age or older.  The median age was 35 years. For every 100 females there were 98.50 males.  For every 100 females age 18 and over, there were 96.70 males.

The median income for a household in the county was $24,224, and the median income for a family was $29,402. Males had a median income of $26,922 versus $18,611 for females. The per capita income for the county was $11,820.  About 22.10% of families and 25.80% of the population were below the poverty line, including 39.00% of those under age 18 and 22.60% of those age 65 or over.

Education

Communities
 Ideal
 Marshallville
 Montezuma
 Oglethorpe (county seat)

Politics

In popular culture
Macon County has been an important setting for season 4 of AMC's hit TV show, The Walking Dead.Macon County was a shooting place for the 2013 movie, The Hunger Games: Catching Fire.

See also

 National Register of Historic Places listings in Macon County, Georgia
List of counties in Georgia

References

External links
 Macon County government

 
Georgia (U.S. state) counties
1837 establishments in Georgia (U.S. state)
Populated places established in 1837
Black Belt (U.S. region)
Majority-minority counties in Georgia